Islandstorget is a station in the Stockholm metro on the Green line. It is located in the district of Södra Ängby, which is part of the borough of Bromma in the west of the city of Stockholm. The station is above ground with a single island platform. The entrance is from Blackebergsvägen, which passes over the line. On a workday there are some 3,450 passengers who travel from Islandstorget.

The site of the station was the western terminus of a line known as the  that ran from Alvik. The Ängbybanan was designed and built for use by the future metro, but was operated from 1944 as part of line 11 of the Stockholm tramway. Islandstorget station was inaugurated as part of the metro on 26 October 1952 with the conversion of the Ängbybanan and its extension to form the metro line between Hötorget and Vällingby.

Gallery

References

External links
Images of Islandstorget station

Green line (Stockholm metro) stations
Railway stations opened in 1952